Wildlife photography is a genre of photography concerned with documenting various forms of wildlife in their natural habitat.

As well as requiring photography skills, wildlife photographers may need field craft skills. For example, some animals and birds are difficult to approach and thus a knowledge of the animal's and birds behavior is needed in order to be able to predict its actions. Photographing some species may require stalking skills or the use of a hide/blind for concealment.

While wildlife photographs can be taken using basic equipment, successful photography of some types of wildlife requires specialist equipment, such as macro lenses for insects, long focal length lenses for birds and underwater cameras for marine life.

History 

In the early days of photography, it was difficult to get a photograph of wildlife due to slow lenses and the low sensitivity of photographic media. Earlier photos of animals were often captive animals. These included photos of lion cubs taken at the Bristol zoo in 1854 and in 1864, photos of the last Quagga by Frank Hayes. Wildlife photography gained more traction when faster photography emulsions and quicker shutters came in the 1880s. Developments like these lead to photos such as the ones taken by German Ottomar Anschutz in 1884, the first shots of wild birds in action. Members of the Delaware Valley Ornithological Club (DVOC) captured early photographs of nesting songbirds in the Philadelphia area in 1897. In July 1906, National Geographic published its first wildlife photos. The photos were taken by George Shiras III, a U.S. Representative from Pennsylvania. Some of his photos were taken with the first wire-tripped camera traps.

Definition 
The world's three largest photography organisations, the Photographic Society of America, the Fédération Internationale de l'Art Photographique and the Royal Photographic Society have adopted a common definition for nature and wildlife photography to govern photography competitions, their respective presidents writing in a joint statement, "The development of a common definition for nature and wildlife photography will be an important step in helping photographers, many of whom enter competitions internationally, know what the rules are. It will also provide organisers with a very clear definition when they need to deal with the problem of ineligible images."

Equipment 
Equipment for wildlife photography can be very specialized.

Some other specialized gear includes camera traps, hides, ghillie suits and flash extenders.

See also
 BeetleCam
 Digiscoping
 Escape distance of animals
 High-speed photography
 National Wildlife Magazine
 Nature photographers
 Nature photography
 Project Noah
 Wildlife observation

References 

Nature photography